Liestiadi (born 14 October 1968) is an Indonesian former football player. He currently coached for Liga 2 club Sriwijaya.

Personal life 
Before getting into coaching, he was a computer teacher in SMA Sutomo in Medan. He holds a Bachelor of Information Technology degree from Institut Teknologi TD Pardede.

Coaching career 
During his time at Arema as Robert Alberts assistant, he won the 2009–10 Indonesia Super League. He was appointed as the assistant for the Indonesia national football team in 2011 and also for several youth national teams.

On 26 November 2014, he signed with Gresik United to coach them for the 2015 Indonesia Super League.

Since 2008, he holds the AFC A coaching licence.

References

External links 
 Profile at scoreway.com

1968 births
Living people
Indonesian footballers
Indonesian people of Chinese descent
Indonesian football managers
Indonesia Super League managers
Arema FC managers
Persiba Balikpapan managers
Gresik United managers
Sportspeople from Medan
Association football midfielders